"Game Over" is a song by French singer Vitaa, featuring vocals from Congolese-French rapper and singer Maître Gims. It was released as the lead single from Vitaa's third album, Ici et maintenant. Released on 23 September 2013, the song hit number one on the SNEP singles chart on 2 November 2013, becoming Vitaa's first number one song and Maître Gims' second.

Charts

Weekly charts

Year-end charts

References

2013 singles
2013 songs
Songs written by Renaud Rebillaud
SNEP Top Singles number-one singles
Songs written by Gims